Michael James Shanly (born December 1945) is a British multimillionaire businessman. He is the founder of the Shanly Group, a housebuilder and commercial property investment firm. He was the only Briton to be "publicly identified" for failing to declare taxes on his Swiss bank account.Swiss Leaks.H

Personal life
Michael James Shanly was born in December 1945. He was born in High Wycombe. He lives at Hurley, Berkshire.

Career
Shanly founded the Shanly Group, a property company headquartered in Beaconsfield, Buckinghamshire in 1969. Its commercial property subsidiary, Sorbon Estates, has invested in market towns including Amersham, Marlow, Maidenhead, Windsor, Berkhamsted and Weybridge.
Michael Shanly is a founder member of The Partnership for the Rejuvenation of Maidenhead (PRoM) a group established in 2008 with a desire to regenerate the town centre. As part of this, Shanly Homes has created Chapel Arches, a three phase scheme off the High Street which will provide 242 new homes across more than three acres, linking with the Maidenhead Waterways project.

Overall, Shanly is the owner of nine companies.

According to the Sunday Times Rich List, Shanly was worth an estimated GBP£265 million in 2014. As of 2015, he is worth an estimated GBP£320 million. In 2012, he was found guilty of tax evasion on his mother's inheritance via a Swiss bank account. He was fined GBP£469,444 for it. He was the only Briton to be "publicly identified" for failing to declare taxes on his Swiss bank account prior to Swiss Leaks. This money had already been donated to a children's charity in 2008.

Philanthropy

In 2015, Michael Shanly was ranked 122nd in Britain's top 200 donors.

In 2017, the Shanly Foundation teamed up with The Scout Association to launch a Building Futures competition to improve meeting places for Scout Groups. Offering 12 prizes ranging from £5,000-£100,000 this was the Foundation's biggest donation to date. The Woodhouse Eaves Scout Group in Loughborough was announced as the main winner and was awarded £100,000 to build a new Scout hut. Michael Shanly himself is a former Scout.

The Shanly Foundation has also had a long-standing partnership with The Woodland Trust since 2010. The Shanly Foundation has helped raise more than £350,000 and funded the planting of more than 20,000 trees specifically in the Heartwood Forest, Hertfordshire.

References

1945 births
Living people
People from High Wycombe
People from Hurley, Berkshire
English company founders
British construction businesspeople